Atlasov may refer to
Vladimir Atlasov (1661–1711), Russian explorer
Atlasov (volcano) in Kamchatka named after Atlasov
Atlasov Island named after Atlasov